{{DISPLAYTITLE:C9H13NO}}
The molecular formula C9H13NO (molar mass : 151.20 g/mol, exact mass : 151.099714) may refer to :

 Cathine
 Gepefrine
 Halostachine
 4-Hydroxyamphetamine
 N-Methyltyramine
 -Norpseudoephedrine
 Phenylpropanolamine, a psychoactive drug